Birgit Bormann (born 14 March 1965) is a German former footballer who played as a forward. She made eight appearances for the Germany national team from 1982 to 1983.

References

External links
 

1965 births
Living people
German women's footballers
Women's association football forwards
Germany women's international footballers